Rouvrois-sur-Othain (literally Rouvrois on Othain) is a commune in the Meuse department in Grand Est in north-eastern France.

Geography
The river Othain forms all of the commune's south-western border.

See also
Communes of the Meuse department

References

Rouvroissurothain